The Pilgrim Lacrosse League was an NCAA Division III men's college lacrosse conference that had member schools in Massachusetts. League operations were absorbed by the New England Women's and Men's Athletic Conference for the 2014 season and the league is now officially known as the NEWMAC Lacrosse League.

Final Pilgrim League Members
The member schools are:
 Babson College 
 Clark University
 Massachusetts Institute of Technology
 Massachusetts Maritime Academy
 Regis College 
 Springfield College
 Wheaton College

Former members
 Eastern Connecticut State University 
 Lasell College 
 Maine Maritime Academy 
 Norwich University
 Plymouth State University
 University of Massachusetts Dartmouth  
 Western New England University

External links
Official site

NCAA Division III conferences
College lacrosse leagues in the United States